Douglas L. Peterson is the president and chief executive officer of S&P Global, formerly McGraw Hill Financial. He became president and chief executive officer in November 2013. Peterson has served on S&P Global’s Board of Directors since July 2013. He originally joined the company as president of Standard & Poor's Ratings Services in 2011.

Education
Peterson was raised in Santa Fe, New Mexico, received his undergraduate degree from Claremont McKenna College and earned his MBA from the Wharton School at the University of Pennsylvania in 1985.

Citigroup
Peterson worked for Citigroup for 26 years. From 2004 to 2010 Peterson was the CEO of Citigroup Japan. He served as chief auditor of Citigroup from 2001 to 2004. Other positions within Citigroup include serving as country manager for Uruguay from 1995 to 1998 and for Costa Rica from 1991 to 1995. Peterson also served as chief operating officer of Citibank from 2010 to 2011.

S&P Global
Peterson became president and CEO of S&P Global in November 2013, and has served on its Global Board of Directors since July 2013. Early in his tenure as CEO, Peterson divested non-core businesses such as McGraw Hill Construction and J.D. Power. He stated that the purpose of these divestitures was to focus the company’s portfolio on the financial intelligence business. As part of this strategy, Peterson oversaw the acquisition of financial data and analytics businesses, including SNL Financial.

In 2016, Peterson announced that the company was changing its name from McGraw Hill Financial to S&P Global and spoke about the company's recent attempts to modernize and rebrand itself. During this time, the company expanded its operations in Asia. In 2016, the company acquired a large interest in Thai rating company, TRIS Rating. The company is also the majority owner of India’s leading credit rating agency and global analytics company, CRISIL. Later that year, S&P Global acquired Trucost, an environmental data and analytics company.

Peterson has overseen investments in the areas of technological innovation, analytics, and environmental, social and governance (ESG) data. In 2018, he oversaw S&P Global’s acquisitions of Kensho, an artificial intelligence firm, and global trade data company Panjiva in 2018. In 2019, the company announced it was acquiring RobecoSAM's ESG tool. S&P Global also announced its intentions to build a domestic credit rating agency in China. In 2019, Chinese regulators gave the company approval to operate in China’s domestic bond market.

In 2020, he oversaw S&P Global's largest acquisition, reaching an all-stock $44bn deal to acquire IHS Markit, expected to be finalized by the end of 2021.

Other ventures 
Peterson  was named to the Business Roundtable’s Board of Directors and selected as chairman of the Roundtable’s Smart Regulation Committee in 2018.

Peterson is co-chair of the Bipartisan Policy Centers’ Executive Council on Infrastructure, and advocates for public-private sector partnerships as a means of improving infrastructure in the US. For the World Economic Forum, Peterson is Co-Chair of the Stewardship Board of the Platform for Shaping the Future of Cities, Infrastructure and Urban Services; a Member of the International Business Council; and Governor of the Financial Services Industry Community. Peterson is also a boardmember of National Bureau of Economic Research, and the US-China Business Council.

Peterson is a member of the Council on Foreign Relations and the Federal Deposit Insurance Corporation's Systemic Resolution Advisory Committee.

Awards and recognition 
In 2019, Doug Peterson was included on Harvard Business Review's The CEO 100, an annual list of the world’s top chief executives.

Nonprofit work 
Peterson serves on the boards of advisors for the Kravis Leadership Institute and the Partnership for New York City. Peterson is a member of the board of trustees for Claremont McKenna College and is also on the board for Paul Taylor Dance Company and the Japan Society.

Personal
Peterson is married and has two sons.

References

American chief executives of financial services companies
Wharton School of the University of Pennsylvania alumni
Claremont McKenna College alumni
American chief executives
Living people
Year of birth missing (living people)